The 2004–05 Maltese Second Division started on 25 September 2004 and ended on 9 May 2005.

Participating teams
 Attard
 Dingli
 Gzira
 Melita
 Mellieha
 Qormi
 Rabat
 St.Andrews
 Santa Venera
 Tarxien
 Vittoriosa
 Zebbug

Changes from previous season
Promoted from Maltese Third Division
 Melita F.C.
 Santa Venera Lightning
 Qormi F.C.

Relegated from 2003–04 Maltese First Division
 Tarxien Rainbows F.C.
 Rabat Ajax F.C.

Final standings

Relegation playoffs

Top scorers

Results

Maltese Second Division seasons
Malta
3